The Man Asian Literary Prize was an annual literary award between 2007 and 2012, given to the best novel by an Asian writer, either written in English or translated into English, and published in the previous calendar year. It is awarded to writers who are citizens or residents of one of the following 34 (out of 50) Asian countries: Afghanistan, Bangladesh, Bhutan, Cambodia, China, East Timor, Hong Kong, India, Indonesia, Iran, Kazakhstan, Kyrgyzstan, Japan, Laos, Macau, Malaysia, Mongolia, Myanmar, Nepal, North Korea, Pakistan, Papua New Guinea, Philippines, Singapore, South Korea, Sri Lanka, Taiwan, Tajikistan, Thailand, The Maldives, Turkey, Turkmenistan, Uzbekistan, Vietnam. Submissions are invited through publishers who are entitled to each submit two novels by August 31 each year. Entry forms are available from May.

From 2010 to 2012, the Man Asian Literary Prize awarded USD 30,000 to the author and an additional USD 5,000 to the translator (if any). For the prize of the first three years of its running, from 2007 to 2009, the Man Asian Literary Prize awarded USD 10,000 (author)/ 3,000 USD (translator) to a novel written by an Asian writer of the elective countries, either in English or translated into English, and yet unpublished. Submissions were made by the authors. The reason given by the Prize for the changes introduced in 2010 include the difficulty in finding talented unpublished authors. With the new format, which has shortlisted and winning novels already available to the literary community, media and general public, the Man Asian Literary Prize recognises “the best English works each year by Asian authors and aims to significantly raise international awareness and appreciation of Asian literature.”

The Man Asian Literary Prize was sponsored by Man Group plc., title sponsor of the Man Booker Prize. It was announced in October 2012 that Man Group would no longer sponsor the prize after the 2012 winner was announced in 2013.

Winners and honorees

See also
 Man Booker Prize
 Man Booker International Prize

References

External links

Asian literary awards
Awards established in 2007
Awards disestablished in 2012
Fiction awards